James Clayden is an Australian director and painter based in Melbourne.

Selected credits
Before Monday (1971) - Super 8
Antarctica (1972) - 60 minutes, Super 8
Persona (1973) - 15 minutes, Super 8
More than Ever (1973) - 20 minutes, Super 8
Workstitle (1975) - 90 minutes, Super 8
The Hour Before My Brother Dies (1986) - feature
With Time to Kill (1987) - feature
Hamlet X (2004) - feature

References

External links

Official website

Australian film directors
Australian painters
Artists from Melbourne
Living people
Year of birth missing (living people)